Kayea macrophylla is a species of flowering plant in the family Calophyllaceae. It is found in West Papua (Indonesia) and Papua New Guinea.

References

macrophylla
Flora of Western New Guinea
Flora of Papua New Guinea
Vulnerable plants
Taxonomy articles created by Polbot
Taxobox binomials not recognized by IUCN